Cyril Robinson (4 March 1929 – 9 November 2019) was an English professional footballer.

He played for Nottingham Boys Club, Basford Hall Youth Club, Mansfield Town, Blackpool, Northwich Victoria, Bradford Park Avenue, Southport, Buxton, Lancaster City, Toronto City, Fleetwood, Blackpool Mechanics, Hellas, and Newcastle.

Robinson died in November 2019, aged 90. He was the last surviving member of the 1953 FA Cup-winning Blackpool team.

References

External links

1929 births
2019 deaths
Footballers from Nottingham
English footballers
Mansfield Town F.C. players
Blackpool F.C. players
Northwich Victoria F.C. players
Southport F.C. players
Bradford (Park Avenue) A.F.C. players
Lancaster City F.C. players
Fleetwood Town F.C. players
A.F.C. Blackpool players
English Football League players
Association football midfielders
Buxton F.C. players
English expatriate footballers
English expatriates in Canada
Expatriate soccer players in Canada
English expatriates in Australia
Expatriate soccer players in Australia
West Adelaide SC players
FA Cup Final players